Bebearia peetersi is a butterfly in the family Nymphalidae. It is found in the Central African Republic (the Sangba Reserve) and northern Cameroon.

References

Butterflies described in 1994
peetersi